Dame Margaret Isabel Cole  (née Postgate; 6 May 1893 – 7 May 1980) was an English socialist politician, writer and poet. She wrote several detective stories jointly with her husband, G. D. H. Cole. She went on to hold important posts in London government after the Second World War.

Life
A daughter of John Percival Postgate and Edith (née Allen) Postgate, Margaret was educated at Roedean School and Girton College, Cambridge. While reading of H. G. Wells, George Bernard Shaw and others at Girton, she came to question the Anglicanism of her upbringing and to embrace socialism after reading notable books on the subject.

Having completed her course (Cambridge did not allow women to graduate formally until 1947), Margaret became a classics teacher at St Paul's Girls' School. Her poem The Falling Leaves, a response to the First World War, and currently on the OCR English Literature syllabus at GCSE, shows the influence of Latin poetry in its use of long and short syllables to create mimetic effects.

Pacifist period
During World War I, her brother Raymond Postgate sought exemption from military service as a socialist conscientious objector, but was denied recognition and jailed for refusing military orders. Her support for her brother led her to a belief in pacifism. During her subsequent campaign against conscription, she met G. D. H. Cole, whom she married in a registry office in August 1918. The couple worked together for the Fabian Society before moving to Oxford in 1924, where they both taught and wrote.

In the early 1930s, Margaret abandoned her pacifism in reaction to the suppression of socialist movements by governments in Germany and Austria and to events in the Spanish Civil War.

Education work
In 1941, Margaret Cole was co-opted onto the Education Committee of the London County Council, nominated by Herbert Morrison, and became a champion of comprehensive education. She was an alderman on London County Council from 1952 until the council's abolition in 1965. She was a member of the Inner London Education Authority from its creation in 1965 until her retirement from public life in 1967.

Harold Wilson had given her an OBE in 1965 and she became a Dame when she was awarded a DBE in 1970 for services to Local Government and Education. Dame Margaret Cole died on 7 May 1980, the day after her 87th birthday. Her estate was valued at £137,957.

Writings
Cole wrote several books, including a biography of her husband. Her brother Raymond was a labour historian, journalist and novelist. She and her husband jointly authored many mystery novels.

Margaret and her husband created a partnership, but not a full marriage: her husband took little interest in sex and regarded women as a distraction from men. Nevertheless, they had a son and two daughters. Margaret Cole comprehensively documented their life together in a biography she wrote of her husband after his death.

Detective fiction

Novels and Short Story Collections
G. D. H. Cole
The Brooklyn Murders (1923). Margaret Cole did not contribute to this novel, which is noted here solely to pre-empt confusion.

G. D. H. and M. Cole
The Death of a Millionaire (1925)
The Blatchington Tangle (1926). Serialised, The Daily Herald (1926)
The Murder at Crome House (1927)
The Man from the River (1928)
Superintendent Wilson's Holiday (1928)
Poison in the Garden Suburb (1929); serialised, The Daily Herald (1929). Also known as Poison in a Garden Suburb
Burglars in Bucks (1930) aka The Berkshire Mystery
Corpse in Canonicals (1930) aka The Corpse in the Constable's Garden
The Great Southern Mystery (1931) aka The Walking Corpse
Dead Man's Watch (1931)Death of a Star (1932)A Lesson in Crime (1933)
A Lesson in Crime; A Question of Coincidence; Mr. Steven's Insurance Policy; Blackmail in the Village; The Cliff Path Ghost; Sixteen Years Run; Wilson Calling (Wilson); The Brentwardine Mystery; The Mother of the Detective; A Dose of Cyanide; Superintendent Wakley's Mistake.The Affair at Aliquid (1933)End of an Ancient Mariner (1933)Death in the Quarry (1934)Big Business Murder (1935)Dr Tancred Begins (1935)Scandal at School (1935) aka The Sleeping DeathLast Will and Testament (1936)The Brothers Sackville (1936)Disgrace to the College (1937)The Missing Aunt (1937)Mrs Warrender's Profession (1938)Off with her Head! (1938)Double Blackmail (1939)Greek Tragedy (1939)Wilson and Some Others (1940)
Death in a Tankard (Wilson); Murder in Church (Wilson); The Bone of the Dinosaur (Wilson); A Tale of Two Suitcases (Wilson); The Motive (Wilson); Glass (Wilson); Murder in Broad Daylight (Wilson); Ye Olde Englysshe Christmasse or Detection in the Eighteenth Century; The Letters; The Partner; A Present from the Empire; The Strange Adventures of a Chocolate Box; Strychnine Tonic.Murder at the Munition Works (1940)Counterpoint Murder (1940)Knife in the Dark (1941)Toper's End (1942)Death of a Bride (1945)Birthday Gifts (1946)The Toys of Death (1948)

Radio plays
G. D. H. and M. ColeMurder in Broad Daylight. BBC Home Service, 1 June 1934 The Bone of the Dinosaur. (Detection Club: Series 1, Episode 6). BBC Home Service, 23 and 27 November 1940

Bibliography
Margaret Cole (1949): Growing up into RevolutionM. I. Cole (1971): The Life of G. D. H. Cole, 
Naomi Mitchison (1982): Margaret Cole, 1893–1980, 
B. D. Vernon (1986): Margaret Cole, 1893–1980: A Political Biography'', 
See under G. D. H. Cole for joint works

References

External links

1893 births
1980 deaths
20th-century British novelists
20th-century British women writers
Alumni of Girton College, Cambridge
British mystery writers
British socialists
British suffragists
British women novelists
Chairs of the Fabian Society
Comprehensive education
Dames Commander of the Order of the British Empire
Members of London County Council
Members of the Detection Club
People educated at Roedean School, East Sussex
Margaret
Presidents of the Fabian Society
Women mystery writers
Edwardian era
Women councillors in England